Nakul Sharma (born 23 October 1993) is an Indian cricketer. He made his List A debut for Services in the 2017–18 Vijay Hazare Trophy on 5 February 2018.

References

External links
 

1993 births
Living people
Indian cricketers
Place of birth missing (living people)
Services cricketers